Colleen Grace Miller (born 30 December 1967) is a Canadian former rower. She competed in the women's lightweight double sculls event at the 1996 Summer Olympics.

References

External links
 

1967 births
Living people
Canadian female rowers
Olympic rowers of Canada
Rowers at the 1996 Summer Olympics
Sportspeople from Manitoba
World Rowing Championships medalists for Canada
20th-century Canadian women